Mattia Righetti (born 10 March 1980 in La Spezia) is an Italian rower.

References 
 
 

1980 births
Living people
Italian male rowers
People from La Spezia
Rowers at the 2000 Summer Olympics
Olympic rowers of Italy

World Rowing Championships medalists for Italy
Sportspeople from the Province of La Spezia